In geometry, an affine plane is a system of points and lines that satisfy the following axioms:
 Any two distinct points lie on a unique line.
 Given any line and any point not on that line there is a unique line which contains the point and does not meet the given line. (Playfair's axiom)
 There exist three non-collinear points (points not on a single line).

In an affine plane, two lines are called parallel if they are equal or disjoint. Using this definition, Playfair's axiom above can be replaced by:
 Given a point and a line, there is a unique line which contains the point and is parallel to the line.

Parallelism is an equivalence relation on the lines of an affine plane.

Since no concepts other than those involving the relationship between points and lines are involved in the axioms, an affine plane is an object of study belonging to incidence geometry. They are non-degenerate linear spaces satisfying Playfair's axiom.

The familiar Euclidean plane is an affine plane. There are many finite and infinite affine planes. As well as affine planes over fields (and division rings), there are also many non-Desarguesian planes, not derived from coordinates in a division ring, satisfying these axioms. The Moulton plane is an example of one of these.

Finite affine planes

If the number of points in an affine plane is finite, then if one line of the plane contains  points then:
 each line contains  points,
 each point is contained in  lines,
 there are  points in all, and
 there is a total of  lines.
The number  is called the order of the affine plane.

All known finite affine planes have orders that are prime or prime power integers. The smallest affine plane (of order 2) is obtained by removing a line and the three points on that line from the Fano plane. A similar construction, starting from the projective plane of order 3, produces the affine plane of order 3 sometimes called the Hesse configuration. An affine plane of order  exists if and only if a projective plane of order  exists (however, the definition of order in these two cases is not the same). Thus, there is no affine plane of order 6 or order 10 since there are no projective planes of those orders. The Bruck–Ryser–Chowla theorem provides further limitations on the order of a projective plane, and thus, the order of an affine plane.

The  lines of an affine plane of order  fall into  equivalence classes of  lines apiece under the equivalence relation of parallelism. These classes are called parallel classes of lines. The lines in any parallel class form a partition the points of the affine plane. Each of the  lines that pass through a single point lies in a different parallel class.

The parallel class structure of an affine plane of order  may be used to construct a set of  mutually orthogonal latin squares. Only the incidence relations are needed for this construction.

Relation with projective planes

An affine plane can be obtained from any projective plane by removing a line and all the points on it, and conversely any affine plane can be used to construct a projective plane by adding a line at infinity, each of whose points is that point at infinity where an equivalence class of parallel lines meets.

If the projective plane is non-Desarguesian, the removal of different lines could result in non-isomorphic affine planes. For instance, there are exactly four projective planes of order nine, and seven affine planes of order nine. There is only one affine plane corresponding to the Desarguesian plane of order nine since the collineation group of that projective plane acts transitively on the lines of the plane. Each of the three non-Desarguesian planes of order nine have collineation groups having two orbits on the lines, producing two non-isomorphic affine planes of order nine, depending on which orbit the line to be removed is selected from.

Affine translation planes

A line  in a projective plane  is a translation line if the group of elations with axis  acts transitively on the points of the affine plane obtained by removing  from the plane . A projective plane with a translation line is called a translation plane and the affine plane obtained by removing the translation line is called an affine translation plane. While in general it is often easier to work with projective planes, in this context the affine planes are preferred and several authors simply use the term translation plane to mean affine translation plane.

An alternate view of affine translation planes can be obtained as follows: Let  be a -dimensional vector space over a field . Then:
 is an affine plane and the group of translations  for a vector  is an automorphism group acting regularly on the points of this plane.

Generalization: -nets

An incidence structure more general than a finite affine plane is a -net of order . This consists of  points and  lines such that:
 Parallelism (as defined in affine planes) is an equivalence relation on the set of lines.
 Every line has exactly  points, and every parallel class has  lines (so each parallel class of lines partitions the point set).
 There are  parallel classes of lines. Each point lies on exactly  lines, one from each parallel class.

An -net of order  is precisely an affine plane of order .

A -net of order  is equivalent  to a set of  mutually orthogonal Latin squares of order .

Example: translation nets

For an arbitrary field , let  be a set of -dimensional subspaces of the vector space , any two of which intersect only in {0} (called a partial spread). If  this is a -net of order . Starting with an affine translation plane, any subset of the parallel classes will form a translation net.

Given a translation net, it is not always possible to add parallel classes to the net to form an affine plane. However, if  is an infinite field, any partial spread  with fewer than  members can be extended and the translation net can be completed to an affine translation plane.

Geometric codes

Not much can be said about these codes at this level of generality, but if the incidence structure has some "regularity" the codes produced this way can be analyzed and information about the codes and the incidence structures can be gleaned from each other. When the incidence structure is a finite affine plane, the codes belong to a class of codes known as geometric codes. How much information the code carries about the affine plane depends in part on the choice of field. If the characteristic of the field does not divide the order of the plane, the code generated is the full space and does not carry any information. On the other hand, 

Furthermore, 

When  the geometric code generated is the -ary Reed-Muller Code.

Affine spaces
Affine spaces can be defined in an analogous manner to the construction of affine planes from projective planes. It is also possible to provide a system of axioms for the higher-dimensional affine spaces which does not refer to the corresponding projective space.

Notes

References

Further reading
 
 

Incidence geometry
Planes (geometry)